Ernie Howe is an English football manager and former player who is currently no longer managing a team after he mutually parted company with Sutton United on 30 March 2008, having failed to pull them out of the Conference South relegation zone. He was Basingstoke Town's manager for 13 years until 2006, winning the Hampshire Senior Cup and promotion during his tenure.

A defender in his playing career, Howe turned out for Fulham alongside the likes of George Best and Rodney Marsh. He was a member of the Fulham squad beaten 2–0 by West Ham United in the 1975 FA Cup Final but did not make the team. He was subsequently transferred to Queens Park Rangers and then Portsmouth. Although not known for his goal scoring Howe scored on his Pompey debut at home to Sheffield United in August 1982. He helped Portsmouth win the Division Three championship that season. The following season before leaving Pompey he also scored in his final home game.

After leaving Portsmouth he was appointed coach at Wokingham Town.

He married the sister of fellow footballer Andy McCulloch, whose father Adam McCulloch had also played.

References

External links 
 Ernie Howe Basingstoke Town Profile

Fulham F.C. players
Queens Park Rangers F.C. players
Portsmouth F.C. players
English football managers
Living people
Basingstoke Town F.C. managers
Sutton United F.C. managers
1953 births
English footballers
Association football defenders